Daniel Richard "Dan" Fox (born 3 March 1983) is an English international field hockey player who played as a defender for England and Great Britain until his retirement from international hockey on 22 December 2016.

Fox made his international debut in 2009 and competed for Great Britain at the London 2012 & 2016 Rio Summer Olympics.

He used to play club hockey in the Men's England Hockey League Premier Division for Old Georgians but currently plays for Guildford Hockey Club.

Fox was educated at King Edward VI Five Ways School and St Edmund Hall, Oxford.

Fox has also played for Holcombe and Hampstead & Westminster.

He has also played first-class cricket for Oxford University Cricket Club.

See also
 List of Oxford University Cricket Club players

References

External links
 
 
 
 

1983 births
Place of birth missing (living people)
Living people
English male field hockey players
English cricketers
2010 Men's Hockey World Cup players
Field hockey players at the 2012 Summer Olympics
2014 Men's Hockey World Cup players
Field hockey players at the 2016 Summer Olympics
Olympic field hockey players of Great Britain
British male field hockey players
Alumni of St Edmund Hall, Oxford
Field hockey players at the 2014 Commonwealth Games
Commonwealth Games bronze medallists for England
Oxford University cricketers
Male field hockey defenders
Commonwealth Games medallists in field hockey
Holcombe Hockey Club players
Hampstead & Westminster Hockey Club players
Oxford MCCU cricketers
Medallists at the 2014 Commonwealth Games